T44 is a Swedish diesel-electric locomotive built by Nydqvist & Holm (NOHAB) and Kalmar Verkstad (KVAB) in 123 units between 1968 and 1987. It was the successor of T43, and used both for hauling and shunting. It is the most common diesel locomotive in Sweden, with state-owned Green Cargo as the largest operator. Other operators include Israel Railways (one), Malmtrafik (two) and formerly Norwegian State Railways (one, designated NSB Di 7) and Inlandsbanan AB.

History
Though mainly used for shunting and freight hauling, T44 class members have occasionally been used to haul passenger trains. In the 1970s they were used on the unelectrified Borlänge-Mora line, and in 1990s on the Inland Line. Compared to the predecessor T43 class, the T44 is more powerful and has a modernized drivers cab, with better noise insulation, though there are many similarities between the models. In appearance the T44 is somewhat more square than the predecessors. Up to three T44s can run in multiple units.

In 1993, SJ T44 276 was sold to the NSB for use as a shunter on the Ofoten Line, and given the designation NSB Di 7, and numbered 634. This engine was transferred, along with SJ T44 283, to Malmtrafik in 1996. When the Swedish State Railways was split in 2001, Green Cargo took over all the T44 locomotives, though four were sold to the Swedish railway company TGOJ (now a subsidiary of Green Cargo). In 2007, Green Cargo has ordered a full renovation of 100 units from Bombardier Transportation which included new four-stroke engines from MTU (type 12V 4000 R43). The renovation is expected to extend the life-time with 15–20 years.
The first rebuilt units were delivered in 2009 and are called Td.

Gallery

References

External links

Järnväg.net entry on T44 
Norsk Jernbaneklubb entry on Di 7 
Jernbane.net entry on T44 SJ - Green Cargo 
Jernbane.net entry on Di 7 

Diesel locomotives of Sweden
Bo′Bo′ locomotives
T44
Green Cargo locomotives
NOHAB locomotives
Iron Ore Line
Railway locomotives introduced in 1968
Standard gauge locomotives of Sweden